Brendan Foley may refer to:
 Brendan Foley (filmmaker)
 Brendan Foley (rugby union)